The Island Darter (Sympetrum nigrifemur) is a species of dragonfly in the family Libellulidae. It is endemic to the Canary Islands and to Madeira. Its natural habitats are rivers, intermittent rivers, intermittent freshwater marshes, and ponds.

S. nigrifemur may be a subspecies of Common Darter, S. striolatum.

References

Libellulidae
Taxonomy articles created by Polbot
Insects described in 1884